Mission College may refer to:

Asia-Pacific International University, formerly known as Mission College
Mission College (California), a two-year community college in Santa Clara, California
Los Angeles Mission College, a two-year community college in the Sylmar district of Los Angeles, California
The College of Missions, a defunct Danish government agency that funded and directed Lutheran missions
Mission College Preparatory High School, in San Luis Obispo, California